L.A. Frock Stars is a documentary television series on the Smithsonian Networks. The reality show stars Doris Raymond, owner of Los Angeles-based high-end vintage clothing boutique The Way We Wore. The first season was released in early 2013; a second season was released in 2015. Episodes follow Raymond and Sarah Bergman, Kyle Edward Blackmon, Jascmeen Busch, Shelly Reiko Lynn as they shop at estate sales and auctions, and interact with celebrities and celebrity stylists shopping in the store.

References

2010s American reality television series
2013 American television series debuts
2015 American television series endings